This is a list of Maltese football transfers for the 2012–13 winter transfer window by club. Only transfers of clubs in the Maltese Premier League and Maltese First Division are included.

The winter transfer window opened on 2 January 2013, although a few transfers may take place prior to that date. The window closed at midnight on 31 January 2013. Players without a club may join one at any time, either during or in between transfer windows.

Maltese Premier League

Balzan

In:

Out:

Birkirkara

In:

Out:

Floriana

In:

Out:

Hibernians

In:

Out:

Ħamrun Spartans

In:

Out:

Melita

In:

Out:

Mosta

In:

Out:

Qormi

In:

Out:

Rabat Ajax

In:

Out:

Sliema Wanderers

In:

Out:

Tarxien Rainbows

In:

Out:

Valletta

In:

Out:

Maltese First Division

Birzebbuga St.Peters

In:

Out:

Dingli Swallows

In:

Out:

Gudja United

In:

Out:

Gżira United

In:

Out:

Lija Athletic

In:

Out:

Marsaxlokk

In:

Out:

Mqabba

In:

Out:

Naxxar Lions

In:

Out:

Pietà Hotspurs

In:

Out:

St. Andrews

In:

Out:

Vittoriosa Stars

In:

Out:

Zejtun Corinthians

In:

Out:

Manager Transfers

See also
 List of Dutch football transfers winter 2012–13
 List of English football transfers winter 2012–13
 List of French football transfers winter 2012–13
 List of German football transfers winter 2012–13
 List of Italian football transfers winter 2012–13
 List of Portuguese football transfers winter 2012–13
 List of Spanish football transfers winter 2012–13
 List of Swedish football transfers winter 2012–13

References

External links
 Official Website

Transfers Winter 2012-13
2012–13
Maltese